Soleil Ô ("Oh, Sun") is a 1970 French-Mauritanian drama film written and directed by Med Hondo.

The title refers to a West Indian song that tells of the pain of the black people from Dahomey (now Benin) who were taken to the Caribbean as slaves.

Premise
A black immigrant makes his way to Paris in search of his Gaul ancestors. The immigrants desperately seek work and a place to live, but find themselves face to face with indifference, rejection, and humiliation, before heeding the final call for uprising.

Cast
Robert Liensol as Visitor
Théo Légitimus as Afro Girl
Gabriel Glissand
Bernard Fresson as Friend
Yane Barry as White Girl
Greg Germain
Armand Meffre
Med Hondo as the narrator

Reception
The film played during the International Critics' Week at the 1970 Cannes Film Festival where it received critical acclaim. It received a Golden Leopard award at the 1970 Locarno International Film Festival.

In his Family Guide to Movies on Video, Henry Herx wrote that the film's "use of ironic humor and lively music keeps the plight of the black emigrant worker from becoming totally depressing."

In The New Yorker, Richard Brody wrote that "Making friends among France’s white population, [the main character] finds their empathy condescending and oblivious, and his sense of isolation and persecution raises his identity crisis to a frenzied pitch. Hondo offers a stylistic collage to reflect the protagonist’s extremes of experience, from docudrama and musical numbers to slapstick absurdity, from dream sequences and bourgeois melodrama to political analyses."

Restoration
In 2017, Soleil Ô was given a restoration by the Cineteca di Bologna with the supervision of Med Hondo. Funding came from the George Lucas Family Foundation and the World Cinema Project, as part of the latter's restoration initiative called the African Film Heritage Project.

See also
List of Mauritanian films

References

External links

Soleil Ô: “I Bring You Greetings from Africa” an essay by Aboubakar Sanogo at the Criterion Collection

1970 films
1970 drama films
1970s Arabic-language films
Films about immigration to France
Films about racism
Films set in France
French black-and-white films
French drama films
1970s French-language films
Golden Leopard winners
Mauritanian drama films
1970 directorial debut films
1970 multilingual films
1970s French films